Cold Springs is a census-designated place (CDP) in Tuolumne County, California. The 2010 United States census reported Cold Springs's population was 181.

Geography
According to the United States Census Bureau, the CDP covers an area of 1.7 square miles (4.5 km2), all of it land.

Demographics
The 2010 United States Census reported that Cold Springs had a population of 181. The racial makeup of Cold Springs was 175 (96.7%) White, 1 (0.6%) African American, 3 (1.7%) Native American, 1 (0.6%) Asian, 0 (0.0%) Pacific Islander, 0 (0.0%) from other races, and 1 (0.6%) from two or more races. Hispanic or Latino of any race were 4 persons (2.2%).

The Census reported that 181 people (100% of the population) lived in households, 0 (0%) lived in non-institutionalized group quarters, and 0 (0%) were institutionalized.

There were 94 households, out of which 15 (16.0%) had children under the age of 18 living in them, 37 (39.4%) were opposite-sex married couples living together, 3 (3.2%) had a female householder with no husband present, 4 (4.3%) had a male householder with no wife present.  There were 9 (9.6%) unmarried opposite-sex partnerships, and 0 (0%) same-sex married couples or partnerships. 40 households (42.6%) were made up of individuals, and 14 (14.9%) had someone living alone who was 65 years of age or older. The average household size was 1.93.  There were 44 families (46.8% of all households); the average family size was 2.70.

The population was spread out, with 28 people (15.5%) under the age of 18, 7 people (3.9%) aged 18 to 24, 33 people (18.2%) aged 25 to 44, 70 people (38.7%) aged 45 to 64, and 43 people (23.8%) who were 65 years of age or older.  The median age was 51.5 years. For every 100 females, there were 112.9 males.  For every 100 females age 18 and over, there were 121.7 males.

The homeowner vacancy rate was 1.5%; the rental vacancy rate was 20.0%.  122 people (67.4% of the population) lived in owner-occupied housing units and 59 people (32.6%) lived in rental housing units.

References

Census-designated places in Tuolumne County, California
Populated places in the Sierra Nevada (United States)